Kararaina Wira-Kohu (born 9 March 1992) is a New Zealand professional rugby league footballer. She previously played for the Newcastle Knights in the NRL Women's Premiership.

Background
Born in Te Tai Tokerau (Whangārei), New Zealand, Wira-Kohu is of Māori descent.

Playing career

Early years
Wira-Kohu played for the Papakura Sisters, before moving to the Manurewa Marlins in 2017, also playing for the Northern Swords that season. Later that year she played for the New Zealand Māori Ferns against the Indigenous All Stars. In 2018, she represented the Auckland women's rugby league team and was named in the New Zealand Māori Ferns squad again. In 2019, she returned to Papakura, represented the Counties Manukau Stingrays and played for the Northland Kauri rugby union side in the Farah Palmer Cup. She continued to represent the New Zealand Māori Ferns in both 2019 and 2020. In 2020, she played for the New Zealand Kiwi Ferns against the Fetū Samoa invitational side. In December 2021, she signed with the Newcastle Knights to be a part of their inaugural NRLW squad.

2022
In round 4 of the delayed 2021 NRL Women's season, Wira-Kohu made her NRLW debut for the Knights against the St. George Illawarra Dragons. She played in 1 match for the Knights, before parting ways with the club at the end of the season.

References

External links
Newcastle Knights profile
NZRL profile

1992 births
New Zealand female rugby league players
New Zealand Māori rugby league players
New Zealand women's national rugby league team players
Newcastle Knights (NRLW) players
Rugby league props
Living people